Joshua Bishop Kelley Sr. (born January 30, 1980) is an American singer-songwriter. Kelley has recorded for Hollywood Records, Threshold Records and DNK Records as a pop rock artist. His songs "Amazing" and "Only You" reached the top ten on the Billboard Adult Top 40 chart.

In 2010, Kelley signed to MCA Nashville and began a country music career. His debut country single, "Georgia Clay", reached the top 20 on the Hot Country Songs charts.

Kelley is married to actress and model Katherine Heigl.

Early life
Kelley was born in Augusta, Georgia to Dr. John W. Kelley, a cardiologist, and Gayle Kelley. Kelley began his musical career at the age of 11. His younger brother, Charles Kelley, is a musician and singer in the country trio Lady A. When he was a teenager, Kelley and his brother Charles formed a band called Inside Blue. By the time he was 14, the band released a CD with five songs on it, which led to a meeting with James Brown. Kelley played the guitar in the high school jazz band alongside Charles (drums) and Dave Haywood (guitar) from Lady A.

Kelley attended the University of Mississippi in Oxford, Mississippi, and is a member of the Kappa Sigma Fraternity.

Music career
Kelley released his independent album, Changing Faces, in 2001 and signed with Hollywood Records in 2002. Working with John Alagia as his record producer, Kelley released the album, For the Ride Home, on June 3, 2003.

Even though Kelley has stated that the lyrics from his song "Angeles" were fabricated, he moved to Los Angeles from Georgia and recorded the majority of his second album, Almost Honest, in the studio of his home. Almost Honest was released on August 23, 2005, and featured the hit single, "Only You."

After asking to be released from his contract with Hollywood Records, Kelley released his third album, Just Say The Word under his own label, Threshold. The digital version of the album was released through iTunes on June 6, 2006, while the physical album was released in stores in the United States on July 25, 2006. "The Pop Game" was the first single from his self-produced album and was accompanied by a cartoon video.

Kelley's next album, Special Company, was released in the United States on January 14, 2008. His label, Threshold, was renamed DNK Records so as to avoid confusion with another record label by the same name. Kelley also released a digital album that summer titled Backwoods on July 7.  On September 23 of that year, Kelley released the album To Remember exclusively through Target stores. The title track was also included on the AT&T Team USA Soundtrack.

Kelley is a supporter of file sharing applications for independent artists who have a difficult time receiving an audience. In fact, Kelley was "found" after targeting Eric Clinger at Hollywood Records with private spam, "If you like James Taylor, Try Josh Kelley," messages using the Napster program.

In November 2009, Kelley signed with MCA Nashville and began recording his first country album in 2010. The album's first single, "Georgia Clay", was released to country radio in August 2010. The single became a Top 20 hit on the Hot Country Songs chart. The album, also entitled Georgia Clay, was released in March 2011.

Kelley released the album New Lane Road in 2016.

Concert tours
Supporting
Revolution Tour  with Miranda Lambert (2011)
Own the Night Tour  with Lady A (2011)
The Driver Tour  with Charles Kelley (2016)

Personal life
Kelley met actress Katherine Heigl in spring 2005 when she appeared in his music video "Only You". One year later, in June 2006, they became engaged. He wrote the song "Hey Katie" for Heigl. The Heigl-Kelley wedding took place on December 23, 2007 at the Stein Eriksen Lodge in Park City, Utah. Heigl's Grey's Anatomy co-stars T.R. Knight, Sandra Oh, Ellen Pompeo and Justin Chambers attended the ceremony, as well as Grey's Anatomy spinoff series Private Practice star Kate Walsh. The ceremony was officiated by Unitarian minister Tom Goldsmith. Heigl walked down the aisle to an acoustic song written by Kelley and performed by a cello and guitar players. The couple wrote their own vows.

During a taping of Live With Regis and Kelly, Heigl stated that she and Kelley chose not to live together before they were married, saying, "I think I just wanted to save something for the actual marriage... I wanted there to be something to make the actual marriage different than the dating or the courtship."

In 2009, the couple adopted a South Korean baby girl, naming her Nancy Leigh, after Heigl's mother and her adopted, Korean-born older sister, respectively. Nancy Leigh's nickname is Naleigh. Nancy Leigh was born with a congenital heart defect that was repaired with open heart surgery before she left South Korea. Kelley and Heigl adopted a second daughter, Adalaide Marie Hope, in April 2012.

In addition to their two daughters, Josh Kelley and Katherine Heigl have a son, Joshua Bishop Kelley Jr., born December 20, 2016.

Kelley, Heigl, and their children live in Oakley, Utah.

Discography

Studio albums

Extended plays

Singles

Guest singles

Other contributions

Music videos

References

External links
 
 
 Josh Kelley collection at the Internet Archive's live music archive
 "The Prince & Me" movie
 [ Billboard Song Chart History]

1980 births
Living people
American country singer-songwriters
American country rock singers
American rock singers
American rock songwriters
American male singer-songwriters
Hollywood Records artists
Musicians from Augusta, Georgia
Writers from Augusta, Georgia
University of Mississippi alumni
MCA Records artists
Male actors from Augusta, Georgia
People from Evans, Georgia
People from Oakley, Utah
21st-century American singers
Singer-songwriters from Georgia (U.S. state)
Singer-songwriters from Utah